Amanda Brooke Pasdon is an American politician and a Republican member of the West Virginia House of Delegates representing District 51 since January 12, 2013. Pasdon served consecutively from January 2011 until January 2013 in the District 44 seat.

Education
Pasdon earned her MBA from West Virginia University.

Elections
2012 Redistricted to District 51 alongside the other three District 44 incumbents, Pasdon ran in the seven-way May 8, 2012 Republican Primary and placed second with 2,453 votes (18.1%), and placed fourth in the eleven-way five-position November 6, 2012 General election with 13,542 votes (10.8%), behind incumbent Democratic Representative Charlene Marshall, former Representative Cindy Frich, and incumbent Representative Barbara Fleischauer, and ahead of incumbent Representative Anthony Barill and non-selectees fellow Republican nominee Kevin Poe (who had run for a District 44 seat in 2010), Democratic nominees Nancy Jamison and Billy Smerka, Republican nominees John Woods and Jay Redmond, and American Third Position candidate Harry Bertram, who had run for governor in 2011.
2010 When District 44 incumbent Democratic Representative Robert Beach ran for West Virginia Senate and left a seat open, Pasdon ran in the five-way May 11, 2010 Republican Primary, placing first with 1,950 votes (23.6%), and placed third in the ten-way four-position November 2, 2010 General election with 9,736 votes (12.5%) behind incumbent Democratic Representatives Charlene Marshall and Barbara Fleischauer, and ahead of Democratic nominee Anthony Barill and non-selectees Chris Walters (R), Stephen Cook (D), Kevin Poe (R), Kevin Patrick (R), Paul Brown (I), and Tad Britch (L).

References

External links
Official page at the West Virginia Legislature
Campaign site

Amanda Pasdon at Ballotpedia
Amanda Pasdon at OpenSecrets

Place of birth missing (living people)
Year of birth missing (living people)
Living people
Republican Party members of the West Virginia House of Delegates
Politicians from Morgantown, West Virginia
University of Georgia alumni
West Virginia University alumni
Women state legislators in West Virginia
21st-century American women